LHV Pank (originally Lõhmus, Haavel & Viisemann) is an Estonian banking and financial services company headquartered in Tallinn. It is a subsidiary of AS LHV Group, a public company listed on the Nasdaq Tallinn Stock Exchange. The bank's clients include private individuals, small and medium-sized companies and institutional investors. LHV Pank is the third largest bank in Estonia. LHV has branch offices in Tallinn, Tartu and Pärnu. LHV Pank employs over 800 people. More than 350 000 clients use the bank's services. LHV Pank is one of the largest brokers on NASDAQ OMX Baltic stock exchanges and the largest broker for Baltic retail investors in international markets.

LHV Pank was fully cash-free—operating only with electronic transfers and card payments—until August 2015, when they opened their first ten Automated teller machine (nine in Tallinn and one in Tartu).

LHV Pank has been identified as a partner in the virtual e-residency of Estonia program, enabling e-residents to open a bank account in Estonia.

Starting November 2018, the bank decided to charge all non-residents and their controlled companies (which includes e-residents and their companies) €10 in case of EU/EEA residents or €20 of others monthly, citing the need for extra financial and anti-laundering control.

History

 1999	Investment firm AS Lõhmus, Haavel & Viisemann founded on February 9
 2000	lhvdirect.com (today's Financial Portal) and the first investment account opened
 The first equity game (today's Stock Exchange Shark) started
 2001	The first investment seminars organised
 2002	Branch opened in Riga
 LHV pension funds created
 2003	LHV Trader trading environment launched
 2004	Head office moved to City Plaza
 2005	Branch opened in Vilnius
 Stock Exchange Shark expanded to Latvia and Lithuania
 2006	Corporate consultations unit separated
 2007	The new LHV logo was introduced instead of Lõhmus, Haavel & Viisemann
 Publication of the Investeeri! magazine started
 LHV World Equities Fund created
 2008	Client Services opened on the first floor of City Plaza
 LHV Persian Gulf Fund created
 2009	Banking license granted on 6 May and new business name AS LHV Pank introduced
 Deposits and commercial loans launched
 2010	Settlement services launched and new account numbers introduced
 Loan portfolio purchased in Finland and branch opened in Helsinki
 Branch opened in Tartu
 2011	New Internet Bank opened
 Issue of bankcards started
 New client service centre opened in Tallinn
 2012	LHV Bank named the Baltic Market Member of the Year
 Launch of LHV Partner Credit Card in cooperation with Tallinna Kaubamaja
 Provision of leasing products started
 2013	Founded LHV Finance and started offering hire-purchase
 Introduced multiple account card and the new Partner Bank Card
 Launch of the mobile bank app
 2014	Launch of Au-client service and gold card
 Started card payment acquiring service
 LHV Bank chosen as the 8th most valued employer in Estonia
 2015	Sold Finnish unsecured loan portfolio
 2021	 the bank announced that it will not finance the purchase of new diesel passenger cars after 2030.

References

External links

Bank Profile: LHV Pank

Banks of Estonia
Estonian brands
Companies listed on Nasdaq Tallinn
Companies based in Tallinn
Banks established in 1999
1999 establishments in Estonia